Bloomin' Brands, Inc. is a restaurant holding company that owns several American casual dining restaurant chains. The company was established in 1988 in Tampa, Florida, where it is headquartered.

History
The company was founded in August 1988 as Multi-Venture Partners, Inc. in Florida by Tim Gannon, Bob Basham, and Chris Sullivan. In 1988 the first Outback Steakhouse was opened in Tampa, Florida. The company went public in 1991 as a  49-restaurant chain and changed its name to Outback Steakhouse, Inc. The Carrabba's Italian Grill was launched in 1993. The company's international expansion began with the first Outback Steakhouse to open in Canada.  Revenues for the company exceed $1 billion for the first time. In 1998 the first units of Roy's Restaurant, Fleming's Prime Steakhouse & Wine Bar, and Lee Roy Selmon's open. Cheeseburger in Paradise was launched several years later in 2002. The Wall Street Journal reported on November 7, 2006, that Bain Capital, Catterton Partners and founders Sullivan, Basham, and Gannon (collectively referred to as Kangaroo Holdings, Inc.), had reached an agreement to buy OSI Restaurant Partners Inc. for about $3 billion.
On April 1, 2019 David Deno became Bloomin' Brands new CEO replacing Elizabeth Smith

Prior to the company becoming OSI Restaurant Partners, LLC, Outback Steakhouse Inc. owned Paul Lee's Chinese Kitchen, Cheeseburger in Paradise, Lee Roy Selmon's,  Bonefish Grill, Roy's, Carrabba's,  Fleming's and Zazarac brands.

The company formerly held the Cheeseburger in Paradise and Lee Roy Selmon's restaurant concepts. OSI also opened Blue Coral Seafood & Spirits in 2006, and planned 15 locations. They had opened two in California: one at Newport Beach in Orange County, and a second in San Diego, until deciding to close in 2009.

Restaurant chains
As of 2021, chains that the company owns and/or operates include:

 Abbraccio (Brazil only)
 Bonefish Grill
 Carrabba's Italian Grill 
 Fleming's Prime Steakhouse & Wine Bar
 Outback Steakhouse

Charitable contributions
In 2001, OS Restaurant Partners and other national restaurants helped to raise $1 million for Dine Out for America for Victims of 9/11.

Political contributions
Bloomin' Brands has a political action committee called the Bloomin' Brands, Inc. Political Action Committee which gives overwhelmingly (75-95% of the time) to conservative and Republican and occasionally Democratic candidates, typically those on Congressional committees overseeing its business sector. Bloomin' Brands, Inc. Political Action Committee was a PAC during the 2016 election. As of the most recent 2018 financial filing from the Federal Election Commission (FEC), the committee raised a total of $334,000 and spent a total of $301,000. During the 2017-18 period so far, as of the most recent financial filing from the Federal Election Commission (FEC), the committee contributed to a mix of Democrats and Republican candidates and committees, as well as specific business sector oriented PACS such as the National Restaurant Association (NRA) PAC.

References

External links
 Official website

 
Companies based in Tampa, Florida
American companies established in 1988
Restaurants established in 1988
1988 establishments in Florida
Restaurant groups in the United States
Companies listed on the Nasdaq
2012 initial public offerings
Australian-themed retailers